In enzymology, a trimethylsulfonium-tetrahydrofolate N-methyltransferase is an enzyme that catalyzes the chemical reaction

trimethylsulfonium + tetrahydrofolate  dimethylsulfide + 5-methyltetrahydrofolate

Thus, the two substrates of this enzyme are trimethylsulfonium and tetrahydrofolate, whereas its two products are dimethyl sulfide and 5-methyltetrahydrofolate.

This enzyme belongs to the family of transferases, specifically those transferring one-carbon group methyltransferases.  The systematic name of this enzyme class is trimethylsulfonium:tetrahydrofolate N-methyltransferase. This enzyme is also called trimethylsulfonium-tetrahydrofolate methyltransferase.  This enzyme participates in one carbon pool by folate.

References

 

EC 2.1.1
Enzymes of unknown structure